Deep Jwele jai is a 1959 Indian Bengali-language film directed by Asit Sen. The film is based on Bengali short story titled Nurse Mitra by Ashutosh Mukherjee. It was remade in Hindi in 1969 by Sen himself as Khamoshi.<ref>Remakes of Bengali Films Whats new in This Trend. The Times of India.</ref> Before that it had been remade in Telugu in 1960 as Chivaraku Migiledi.

Plot
This is a story of a nurse in a psychiatric hospital, played by Suchitra Sen. Sen's character is a part of a team exploring new therapy for patients who have suffered emotional trauma. The approach taken by the team is to offer these individuals an emotional resort, which is where Sen's character plays her part. Her role is to act as a friend and a lover for the patient, but at the same time, refrain from any emotional involvement on her own part as her role is purely that of a nurse who is helping the patient recover. She has to repeatedly break the emotional attachments that she experiences because as a nurse, she is a part of therapy.

The movie looks at the neglected emotional trauma of this nurse who is used merely as a tool in the whole process of therapy. The movie ends by showing that the Sen is being admitted to the same ward where she used to be a nurse. The last words in the movie are uttered by Sen, who whispers out "I wasn't acting, I couldn't" indicating that she indeed fell in love with her patient! Also cast among others, were Pahari Sanyal, who plays a veteran doctor eager to explore new grounds, but hesitant of the human costs. Basanta Chowdhury plays as an artist and a lover-scorned.

The music was directed by Hemanta Mukherjee, and one of the songs, "Ei Raat Tomar Amar" (This night's just for you and me) has come to be regarded as one of the greatest and sensuous love song ever sung in Bengali.

Cast
Suchitra Sen as Radha
Basanta Choudhury as Tapash
Pahari Sanyal as Psychiatrist
Tulsi Chakraborty
Anil Chatterjee as Patient at mental asylum
Chandrabati Devi as Matron
Shyam Laha
Namita Sinha
Kajari Guha
Dilip Choudhury

Soundtrack

Remakes
The film turned out to be a big hit, especially in the urban centres. Impressed by the storyline, producer Vuppunuthula Purushotham Reddy and director Gutha Ramineedu remade the Bengali film into Chivaraku Migiledi in Telugu starring Savitri which flopped at the box office though. The director Asit Sen would later remake the film in Hindi as Khamoshi (Silence) (1969), starring Waheeda Rehman, Rajesh Khanna, and Dharmendra in a guest role.

In 1986, Priyadarshan drew inspiration from the English novel One Flew Over the Cuckoo's Nest and the above 3 films and made the Malayalam film Thalavattam. It was remade in Hindi as Kyon Ki'' in 2005 starring Salman Khan, Kareena Kapoor, Rimi Sen, Jackie Shroff, and Om Puri.

References

External links
 

Bengali-language Indian films
1959 films
Films set in psychiatric hospitals
Films based on short fiction
Films scored by Hemant Kumar
Bengali films remade in other languages
1950s Bengali-language films
Films based on works by Ashutosh Mukhopadhyay